HD 143183 is a red supergiant variable star of spectral type M3Ia in constellation Norma. It is a member of the Norma OB1 association, at a distance of about 2 kiloparsecs. It is one of the most luminous red supergiants with a luminosity over 100,000 times greater than the Sun, and is as well one of the largest stars with a radius more than a thousand times that of the Sun. Older studies frequently calculated higher luminosities and radii. It is surrounded by a dozen early-type stars and a circumstellar nebula which extends .

HD 143183 is catalogued with the variable star designation V558 Normae as its brightness varies irregularly between apparent magnitudes 7.3 and 8.6.

It is possible that HD 143183 is a spectroscopic binary with an OB+ companion but this is considered doubtful.  HD 143183 lies approximately 1' from the 10th-magnitude O-class bright giant CD-53 6363, the second-brightest star in the cluster.

Notes

References

Norma (constellation)
M-type supergiants
M-type hypergiants
143183
J16013621-5408356
IRAS catalogue objects
CD-53 6947
Slow irregular variables
Normae, V558